Sylvie Von Duuglas-Ittu is an American Muay Thai fighter known for documenting her evolving career on her YouTube channel as well as archiving and spreading the history of the sport through its legends. As of January 2023, she is the Minimumweight WBC Muaythai World Champion, and ranked first at Mini flyweight by the WMO (World Muaythai Organization).

Biography 
Sylvie first trained in Muay Thai under a 70-year-old Thai man named Kumron Vaiyatanon ("Master K") at the end of 2007, and would start documenting her Muay Thai journey a few months after. At first, it was only training footage but in 2009, she started making video journals, which still continues to this day. Sylvie eventually had her first fight in June 2009, a fight that she lost.

In 2010, after "Master K" had had a health scare that required heart surgery, Sylvie and her husband Kevin decided to go to Thailand so that Sylvie could learn Muay Thai where the sport was born: "Once we felt training in Thailand, the country, the people, the Muay – both training and fighting here – it was clear we wanted to come back." While there, she fought twice and won both of her fights.

It would not be until 2012 that they would be back to Thailand, and in between that time, Sylvie had only won two of nine amateur fights in the U.S. The duration of their stay in Thailand was still uncertain at this point but neither Sylvie nor her husband expected that they would be staying there until today (November 2021).

Sylvie initially trained at Lanna Muay Thai gym in Chiang Mai, and fought 80 fights there from 2012 to 2014. In 2014, after "soul-searching", Sylvie decided to move to the famous Petchrungruang gym in Pattaya, a gym that has produced fighters such as prodigy Jatukam Petchrungruang (now known as Tawanchai P.K. Saenchai) and Isuzu Cup champion PTT Phetrungruang. She trained there from 2014 to August 2020 when she announced that she was leaving the gym. As of November 2021, she is unaffiliated with a gym but has changed her ring name from "Sylvie Petchrungruang" to "Sylvie KemicalX".

With over 200 fights to her name, Sylvie is one of the most active fighters in the world and perhaps the female fighter with the most documented professional fights of all time.

Titles and accomplishments

Muay Thai
 2014 Queen's Cup 102 lbs champion
 2014 Chonburi Buffalo Race Festival (Chua Kraow Stadium) champion
 2014 Sriracha 110 lbs champion
 2014 Thepprasit Stadium 105 lbs champion
 2015 Chonburi Buffalo Race Festival (Chua Kraow Stadium) 105 lbs champion
 2015 Sattahip Loi Krathong Festival 115 lbs champion
 2016 Muay Siam 105 lbs Northern Thailand Champion
 2017 Thepprasit Stadium 105 lbs champion
 2019 IPCC World 108 lbs champion
 2020 IPCC World 112 lbs champion
 2023 WBC Muaythai World Minimumweight Champion

Fight record

|-  style="background:#cfc;"
| 2023-02-04 || Win ||align=left| Elisabetta Solinas || Amazing Muay Thai Festival || Hua Hin, Thailand||  ||  || 
|-
! style=background:white colspan=9 |

|-  style="text-align:center; background:#c5d2ea;"
| 2022-12-23 || Draw ||align=left| Plaifah Boonmarkpraewa || Siam Kard Chuek Pharanakhon || Bangkok, Thailand || time limit || 5 || 2:00

|-  style="text-align:center; background:#cfc;"
| 2022-08-25 || Win ||align=left| Gulapphet Sonpichai	 || Patong Boxing Stadium || Phuket, Thailand || TKO || 3 ||

|-  style="text-align:center; background:#cfc;"
| 2022-07-02 || Win ||align=left| Nuafaa Sor.Songpam ||  || Hua Hin, Thailand || TKO || 3 ||

|-  style="text-align:center; background:#cfc;"
| 2022-04-30 || Win ||align=left| Nong Bell Phetpirat ||  || Hua Hin, Thailand || TKO || 4 ||

|-  style="text-align:center; background:#cfc;"
| 2022-02-25 || Win ||align=left| Nong Aim GT Fitness ||  || Hua Hin, Thailand || Decision || 5 || 2:00

|-  style="text-align:center; background:#cfc;"
| 2021-12-19 || Win ||align=left| Petchrodtang Sungilaboplab ||  || Phuket, Thailand || TKO || 2 ||

|-  style="text-align:center; background:#cfc;"
| 2021-03-18 || Win ||align=left| Phettae Kaewsamrit ||  || Chaiyaphum, Thailand || TKO || 2 ||

|-  style="text-align:center; background:#cfc;"
| 2020-12-12 || Win ||align=left| Aiyara Kohyaomuaythai || Muay Kard Chuek || Songkhla, Thailand || Decision || 3 || 3:00

|-  style="text-align:center; background:#cfc;"
| 2020-11-21 || Win ||align=left| Jumliat Phetsimuen ||  || Phatthalung, Thailand || KO || 2 ||

|-  style="text-align:center; background:#cfc;"
| 2020-10-23 || Win ||align=left| Namthip Sor.Anucha || MahakramMuaykokietSanjorn SomsernkantorntrielChiangRai + Parkodamfight SuekMadamOh || Chiang Rai, Thailand || Decision || 5 || 3:00 
|-
! style=background:white colspan=9 |

|-  style="text-align:center; background:#cfc;"
| 2020-03-08 || Win ||align=left| Palmy Or.Sanitpan || Thapae Boxing Stadium || Chiang Rai, Thailand || Decision || 5 || 3:00

|-  style="text-align:center; background:#cfc;"
| 2020-02-09 || Win || align="left" | Phetampu Kiatpetmongkol || Patong Boxing Stadium || Phuket, Thailand || Decision || 5 || 3:00

|-  style="text-align:center; background:#cfc;"
| 2020-02-08 || Win||align=left| Kulappet Sornpichai || Patong Boxing Stadium || Phuket, Thailand || TKO || 3 ||

|-  style="text-align:center; background:#cfc;"
| 2020-01-06 || Win ||align=left| Pornpan Por.Muangpet || Grand Boxing Stadium  || Hua Hin, Thailand || Decision || 5 || 3:00

|-  style="text-align:center; background:#cfc;"
| 2020-01-02 || Win ||align=left| Namthip Sor.Anucha ||  || Chiang Mai, Thailand || Decision || 5 || 3:00

|-  style="text-align:center; background:#cfc;"
| 2019-12-25 || Win ||align=left| Kulabdam Kohyaomuaythai || Muay Kard Chuek || Khao Lak, Thailand || TKO || 4 ||

|-  style="text-align:center; background:#fbb;"
| 2019-11-15 || Loss ||align=left| Nongpon Singwangcha || Grand Boxing Stadium || Hua Hin, Thailand || Decision || 5 || 3:00

|-  style="text-align:center; background:#cfc;"
| 2019-11-11 || Win ||align=left| Aiyara Kohyaomuaythai || Muay Kard Chuek || Nakhon Pathom, Thailand || TKO  || 4 ||

|-  style="text-align:center; background:#cfc;"
| 2019-11-09 || Win ||align=left| Khaotommat Sitpootong || Hua Hin Boxing Stadium || Hua Hin, Thailand || TKO  || 3 ||

|-  style="text-align:center; background:#fbb;"
| 2019-10-31 || Loss ||align=left| Dangkongfah Jaoseuanoimuaythai ||  || Khorat, Thailand || Decision  || 5 || 3:00

|-  style="text-align:center; background:#cfc;"
| 2019-10-11 || Win ||align=left| Nanghong Liangprasert || Anusarn Ring || Chiang Rai, Thailand || Decision || 5 || 3:00

|-  style="text-align:center; background:#cfc;"
| 2019-10-09 || Win ||align=left| Namthip Sor.Anucha || Anusarn Ring || Chiang Mai, Thailand || TKO || 4 ||

|-  style="text-align:center; background:#c5d2ea;"
| 2019-09-27 || Draw ||align=left| Rungarun Suan NongnuchaPattaya || Muay Kard Chuek || Lopburi, Thailand || time limit || 5 || 3:00

|-  style="text-align:center; background:#fbb;"
| 2019-09-22 || Loss ||align=left| Kulabpit Ayumuaythai || JF Boxing Stadium || Pattaya, Thailand || Decision || 3 || 3:00

|-  style="text-align:center; background:#cfc;"
| 2019-09-13 || Win ||align=left| Namthip Sor.Anucha || Anusarn Ring || Chiang Mai, Thailand || Decision || 5 || 3:00

|-  style="text-align:center; background:#cfc;"
| 2019-09-11 || Win ||align=left| Phetnamnueng R.R.Kelalampang || Chiang Mai Boxing Stadium || Chiang Mai, Thailand || TKO || 2 ||

|-  style="text-align:center; background:#cfc;"
| 2019-08-30 || Win ||align=left| Nanghong Liangprasert || Anusarn Ring || Chiang Mai, Thailand || Decision || 5 || 3:00

|-  style="text-align:center; background:#fbb;"
| 2019-08-28|| Loss ||align=left| Palmy Or.Sanitpan || Anusarn Ring || Chiang Mai, Thailand || Decision || 5 || 3:00

|-  style="text-align:center; background:#cfc;"
| 2019-08-24 || Win ||align=left| Jomkwan SitThongsak || Hua Hin Boxing Stadium || Hua Hin, Thailand || Decision || 5 || 3:00

|-  style="text-align:center; background:#cfc;"
| 2019-07-29 || Win ||align=left| Palmy Or.Sanitpan || Thapae Stadium || Chiang Mai, Thailand || Decision || 5 || 3:00

|-  style="text-align:center; background:#cfc;"
| 2019-07-27 || Win ||align=left| Jomkwan SitThongsak || Hua Hin Boxing Stadium || Hua Hin, Thailand || KO || 4 ||

|-  style="text-align:center; background:#cfc;"
| 2019-06-27 || Win ||align=left| Palmy Or.Sanitpan || Thapae Stadium || Chiang Mai, Japan || TKO || 4 ||

|-  style="text-align:center; background:#fbb;"
| 2019-06-06 || Loss ||align=left| Hongthong Liangprasert || Thapae Stadium || Chiang Mai, Thailand || Decision || 5 || 3:00

|-  style="text-align:center; background:#cfc;"
| 2019-05-11 || Win ||align=left| Nongbenz Sakchatri ||  || Chiang Rai, Thailand || TKO || 3 ||
|-
! style=background:white colspan=9 |

|-  style="text-align:center; background:#cfc;"
| 2019-04-24 || Win ||align=left| Hongthong Liangprasert ||  || Chiang Mai, Thailand || Decision || 5 || 3:00

|-  style="text-align:center; background:#cfc;"
| 2019-04-22 || Win ||align=left| Namthip Sor.Anucha || Thapae Stadium || Chiang Mai, Thailand || TKO || 3 ||

|-  style="text-align:center; background:#cfc;"
| 2019-04-14 || Win ||align=left| Sangmanee Sor.Prasongchai ||  || Trat, Thailand || Decision || 5 || 3:00

|-  style="text-align:center; background:#fbb;"
| 2019-03-21 || Loss ||align=left| Palmy Or.Sanitpan || Thapae Stadium || Chiang Mai, Thailand || Decision || 5 || 3:00

|-  style="text-align:center; background:#cfc;"
| 2019-03-15 || Win ||align=left| Phetngerntong Mor.Krunghtepthonburi || Muay Kard Chuek || Nakhon Pathom, Thailand || Decision || 5 || 3:00

|-  style="text-align:center; background:#cfc;"
| 2019-03-10 || Win ||align=left| Palmy Or.Sanitpan ||  || Chiang Mai, Thailand || Decision || 5 || 3:00

|-  style="text-align:center; background:#cfc;"
| 2019-02-27 || Win ||align=left| Nongbenz Sakchatri || Thapae Stadium || Chiang Mai, Thailand || KO || 4 ||

|-  style="text-align:center; background:#cfc;"
| 2019-02-01 || Win ||align=left| Darphet LampangUniversity || Thapae Stadium || Chiang Mai, Thailand || TKO || 3 ||

|-  style="text-align:center; background:#fbb;"
| 2019-01-14 || Loss ||align=left| Thanonchanok Kaewsamrit || Thapae Stadium || Chiang Mai, Thailand || Decision || 5 || 3:00

|-  style="text-align:center; background:#fbb;"
| 2018-12-22 || Loss ||align=left| Nongbenz Sakchatri || Thapae Stadium || Chiang Mai, Thailand || Decision || 5 || 3:00

|-  style="text-align:center; background:#cfc;"
| 2018-11-26 || Win ||align=left| Nanghong Liangprasert || Thapae Stadium || Chiang Mai, Thailand || TKO || 4 ||

|-  style="text-align:center; background:#c5d2ea;"
| 2018-11-26 || Draw ||align=left| Nongnan Wor.Wor.Kelasukhotai || Muay Kard Chuek || Phitsanulok, Thailand || time limit || 5 || 3:00

|-  style="text-align:center; background:#cfc;"
| 2018-11-08 || Win ||align=left| Hongmorakot Liangprasert || Thapae Stadium || Chiang Mai, Thailand || KO || 5 ||

|-  style="text-align:center; background:#cfc;"
| 2018-10-26 || Win ||align=left| Thanonchanok Kaewsamrit || Thapae Stadium || Chiang Mai, Thailand || Decision || 5 || 3:00

|-  style="text-align:center; background:#cfc;"
| 2018-10-08 || Win ||align=left| Payayong SSChiangmai || Thapae Stadium || Chiang Mai, Thailand || Decision || 5 || 3:00

|-  style="text-align:center; background:#fbb;"
| 2018-09-24 || Loss ||align=left| Payayong SSChiangmai || Thapae Stadium || Chiang Mai, Thailand || Decision || 5 || 3:00

|-  style="text-align:center; background:#cfc;"
| 2018-09-12|| Win ||align=left| Phetseerung Wor.Worakon || Thapae Stadium || Chiang Mai, Thailand || TKO || 4 ||

|-  style="text-align:center; background:#cfc;"
| 2018-08-31 || Win ||align=left| Motdaeng Cherngtalaymuaythai || Muay Kard Chuek || Lopburi, Thailand || TKO  || 3 ||

|-  style="text-align:center; background:#fbb;"
| 2018-08-22 || Loss ||align=left| Palmy Or.Sanitpan || Thapae Stadium || Chiang Mai, Thailand || TKO (doctor stoppage)  || 3 ||

|-  style="text-align:center; background:#cfc;"
| 2018-08-01 || Win ||align=left| Petseerung Wor.Worakon || Thapae Stadium || Chiang Mai, Thailand || Decision || 5 || 3:00

|-  style="text-align:center; background:#fbb;"
| 2018-07-30 || Loss ||align=left| Wondergirl Lookjaroonsak ||  || Bangkok, Thailand || Decision || 5 || 3:00

|-  style="text-align:center; background:#fbb;"
| 2018-07-06 || Loss ||align=left| Nongbenz Sitdobwad || Thapae Stadium || Chiang Mai, Thailand || Decision || 5 || 3:00

|-  style="text-align:center; background:#cfc;"
| 2018-06-19 || Win ||align=left| Nanghong Liangprasert || Thapae Stadium || Chiang Mai, Thailand || Decision || 5 || 3:00

|-  style="text-align:center; background:#cfc;"
| 2018-06-09 || Win ||align=left| Hongthong Liangprasert  || Thapae Stadium || Chiang Mai, Thailand || Decision || 5 || 3:00

|-  style="text-align:center; background:#cfc;"
| 2012-06-07 || Win ||align=left| Nanghong Liangprasert ||  || Uttaradit, Thailand || Decision || 5 || 3:00

|-  style="text-align:center; background:#cfc;"
| 2018-05-30 || Win ||align=left| Muangsingjiew Or.Wanchert || Thepprasit Boxing Stadium || Pattaya, Thailand || Decision || 5 || 3:00

|-  style="text-align:center; background:#cfc;"
| 2018-05-22 || Win ||align=left| Nongbenz Sitdobwad || Thapae Stadium || Chiang Mai, Thailand || Decision || 5 || 3:00

|-  style="text-align:center; background:#fbb;"
| 2018-05-04 || Loss ||align=left| Nongprae Sitjenwong ||  || Roi Et, Thailand || Decision || 5 || 3:00

|-  style="text-align:center; background:#fbb;"
| 2018-04-24 || Loss ||align=left| Thanonchanok Kaewsamrit  || Thapae Stadium || Chiang Mai, Thailand || Decision || 5 || 3:00

|-  style="text-align:center; background:#cfc;"
| 2018-03-19 || Win ||align=left| Phetseerung Wor.Woragon  || Thapae Stadium || Chiang Mai, Thailand || Decision || 5 || 3:00

|-  style="text-align:center; background:#fbb;"
| 2018-03-16 || Loss ||align=left| Kaewda Por.Muangpet ||  || Ayutthaya, Thailand || Decision || 5 || 3:00

|-  style="text-align:center; background:#cfc;"
| 2018-02-28 || Win ||align=left| Muangsingjiew Or.Wanchert ||  || Nakhon Ratchasima, Thailand || Decision || 5 || 3:00

|-  style="text-align:center; background:#cfc;"
| 2018-02-17 || Win ||align=left| Duangpen Sitthongsak ||  || Nakhon Ratchasima, Thailand || Decision || 5 || 3:00

|-  style="text-align:center; background:#cfc;"
| 2018-01-20 || Win ||align=left| Khaotip Moobangawin  || Chiang Mai Boxing Stadium || Chiang Mai, Thailand || KO || 2 ||

|-  style="text-align:center; background:#cfc;"
| 2018-01-18 || Win ||align=left| Kulabdam Sor.Nor.Nor.Lampang || Thapae Stadium || Chiang Mai, Thailand || TKO || 4 ||

|-  style="text-align:center; background:#c5d2ea;"
| 2017-12-29 || Draw ||align=left| Phetyodying Mor.Rajabhatchombueng || Muay Kard Chuek || Suphan Buri, Thailand || time limit || 5 || 3:00

|-  style="text-align:center; background:#cfc;"
| 2017-12-22 || Win ||align=left| Nongnit Chor.Jaylimchai || Chiang Mai Boxing Stadium || Chiang Mai, Thailand || TKO || 3 ||

|-  style="text-align:center; background:#cfc;"
| 2017-12-20 || Win ||align=left| Ticha R.R.Kelakhorat || Thapae Stadium || Chiang Mai, Thailand || Decision || 5 || 3:00

|-  style="text-align:center; background:#fbb;"
| 2017-11-25 || Loss ||align=left| Thaksapon Intachai || Muay Kard Chuek || Prachinburi, Thailand || Decision || 5 || 3:00

|-  style="text-align:center; background:#fbb;"
| 2017-11-14 || Loss ||align=left| Nong Biew || Thepprasit Stadium || Pattaya, Thailand || TKO (stoppage) || 5 ||

|-  style="text-align:center; background:#c5d2ea;"
| 2017-11-03|| Draw ||align=left| Hongkhao Sor.Sayan || Muay Kard Chuek || Pathum Thani, Thailand || time limit || 5 || 3:00

|-  style="text-align:center; background:#cfc;"
| 2017-10-24 || Win ||align=left| Payayong S.S.Chiangmai || Thapae Stadium || Chiang Mai, Thailand || Decision || 5 || 3:00

|-  style="text-align:center; background:#cfc;"
| 2017-10-09 || Win ||align=left| Sudsiam Sor.Sumalee || Chiang Mai Boxing Stadium || Chiang Mai, Thailand || Decision || 5 || 3:00

|-  style="text-align:center; background:#cfc;"
| 2017-10-08 || Win ||align=left| Hongthong Liangprasert || Thapae Stadium || Chiang Mai, Thailand || Decision || 5 || 3:00

|-  style="text-align:center; background:#cfc;"
| 2017-09-28 || Win ||align=left| Daolomduan Mekvolum || Thepprasit Stadium || Pattaya, Thailand || TKO || 4 || 
|-
! style=background:white colspan=9 |

|-  style="text-align:center; background:#cfc;"
| 2017-09-21 || Win ||align=left| Koogik Soonkelaboplap || Muay Kard Chuek, Siam Plaza || Nakhon Pathom, Thailand || TKO || 4 ||

|-  style="text-align:center; background:#cfc;"
| 2017-09-15 || Win||align=left| Phetseerung Wor.Woragon || Thapae Stadium || Chiang Mai, Thailand || TKO || 4 ||

|-  style="text-align:center; background:#fbb;"
| 2017-09-14 || Loss ||align=left| Sudsiam Sor.Sumalee || Chiang Mai Boxing Stadium || Chiang Mai, Thailand || Decision || 5 || 3:00

|-  style="text-align:center; background:#fbb;"
| 2017-08-25 || Loss ||align=left| Muangsingjiew Or.Wanchert ||  || Suphan Buri, Thailand || Decision || 5 || 3:00

|-  style="text-align:center; background:#cfc;"
| 2017-07-18 || Win||align=left| Nanghong Liangprasert || Thapae Stadium || Chiang Mai, Thailand || Decision || 5 || 3:00

|-  style="text-align:center; background:#cfc;"
| 2017-09-17 || Win ||align=left| Honey Bor.Boondit || Chiang Mai Boxing Stadium || Chiang Mai, Thailand || Decision || 5 || 3:00

|-  style="text-align:center; background:#c5d2ea;"
| 2017-07-07 || Draw ||align=left| Thaksapon Intachai || Muay Kard Chuek || Suphan Buri, Thailand || time limit || 5 || 3:00

|-  style="text-align:center; background:#cfc;"
| 2017-06-29 || Win ||align=left| Kulabkhao Kiatnumpotong || Thapae Stadium || Chiang Mai, Thailand || TKO || 4 ||

|-  style="text-align:center; background:#c5d2ea;"
| 2017-06-16 || Draw ||align=left| Phetyodying Mor.Rabjabhatchombueng || Muay Kard Chuek || Nakhon Pathom, Thailand || time limit || 5 || 3:00

|-  style="text-align:center; background:#cfc;"
| 2017-06-02 || Win ||align=left| Payayong S.SChiangmai || Thapae Stadium || Chiang Mai, Thailand || Decision || 5 || 3:00

|-  style="text-align:center; background:#fbb;"
| 2017-05-06 || Loss ||align=left| Thanonchanok Kaewsamrit || Thapae Stadium || Chiang Mai, Thailand || Decision || 5 || 3:00

|-  style="text-align:center; background:#cfc;"
| 2017-05-02 || Win ||align=left| Sudsiam Sor.Sumalee || Thapae Stadium || Chiang Mai, Thailand || Decision || 5 || 3:00

|-  style="text-align:center; background:#cfc;"
| 2017-04-22 || Win ||align=left| Duanpen Sitthongsak ||  || Khorat, Thailand || Decision || 5 || 3:00

|-  style="text-align:center; background:#cfc;"
| 2017-04-10 || Win ||align=left| Nong-On Bor.Buipoonput ||  || Chiang Mai, Thailand || TKO || 3 ||

|-  style="text-align:center; background:#cfc;"
| 2017-04-08 || Win ||align=left| NongKwangtong Phettongput || || Chiang Mai, Thailand || Decision || 5 || 3:00

|-  style="text-align:center; background:#cfc;"
| 2017-04-06 || Win ||align=left| NongMorakot Liangprasert ||  || Chiang Mai, Thailand || TKO || 4 ||

|-  style="text-align:center; background:#fbb;"
| 2017-03-28 || Loss ||align=left| Stamp Kiatboongern || Thepprasit Stadium || Pattaya, Thailand || Decision || 5 || 3:00
|-
! style=background:white colspan=9 |

|-  style="text-align:center; background:#cfc;"
| 2017-03-16 || Win ||align=left| Sudsiam Sor.Sumalee || Thapae Stadium || Chiang Mai, Thailand || Decision || 5 || 3:00

|-  style="text-align:center; background:#cfc;"
| 2017-02-25|| Win ||align=left| Nantida Sitweerachat ||  || Nong Bua Lam Phu, Thailand || Decision || 5 || 3:00

|-  style="text-align:center; background:#fbb;"
| 2017-02-20 || Loss ||align=left| Thanonchanok Kaewsamrit ||  || Chiang Mai, Thailand || Decision || 5 || 3:00

|-  style="text-align:center; background:#cfc;"
| 2017-02-18 || Win ||align=left| Yodying Sor.Sumalee || Thapae Stadium || Chiang Mai, Thailand || TKO || 3 ||

|-  style="text-align:center; background:#cfc;"
| 2017-02-10 || Win ||align=left| NongMat Huasarayiam ||  || Nakhon Ratchasima, Thailand || Decision || 5 || 3:00

|-  style="text-align:center; background:#fbb;"
| 2017-02-06 || Loss ||align=left| Zaza Sor.Aree ||  || Bangkok, Thailand || Decision || 5 || 3:00

|-  style="text-align:center; background:#fbb;"
| 2017-01-29 || Loss ||align=left| Fahchiangrai Sor.Sakunthong ||  || Lopburi, Thailand || Decision || 5 || 3:00

|-  style="text-align:center; background:#cfc;"
| 2017-01-24 || Win ||align=left| Baifern Bor.Buipoonput || U.S.A vs Thailand, Kawilla Stadium || Chiang Mai, Thailand || Decision || 5 || 3:00

|-  style="text-align:center; background:#fbb;"
| 2017-01-07 || Loss ||align=left| Nanghong Liangprasert || Thapae Stadium || Chiang Mai, Thailand || TKO (cut) || 5 || 3:00

|-  style="text-align:center; background:#cfc;"
| 2016-12-24 || Win ||align=left| Namwan Senyentafo ||  || Chiang Mai, Thailand || Decision || 5 || 3:00

|-  style="text-align:center; background:#fbb;"
| 2016-12-23 || Loss ||align=left| Thanonchanok Kaewsamrit || Kawilla Stadium || Chiang Mai, Thailand || Decision || 5 || 3:00

|-  style="text-align:center; background:#cfc;"
| 2016-12-21 || Win ||align=left| Hongpet Liangprasert || Thapae Stadium || Chiang Mai, Thailand || TKO || 3 ||

|-  style="text-align:center; background:#fbb;"
| 2016-12-05 || Loss ||align=left| Mari Veronafarm || King Rama IX Memorial, Lumpinee Park || Bangkok, Thailand || Decision || 5 || 3:00
|-
! style=background:white colspan=9 |

|-  style="text-align:center; background:#cfc;"
| 2016-11-17 || Win ||align=left| Nongkwangtong Phettonpung ||  || Chiang Mai, Thailand || Decision || 5 || 3:00

|-  style="text-align:center; background:#cfc;"
| 2016-11-16 || Win ||align=left| Thanonchanok Kaewsamrit ||  || Chiang Mai, Thailand || Decision || 5 || 3:00

|-  style="text-align:center; background:#cfc;"
| 2016-11-09 || Win ||align=left| Nongkwangtong Phettonpung ||  || Chiang Mai, Thailand || Decision || 5 || 3:00

|-  style="text-align:center; background:#cfc;"
| 2016-11-08 || Win ||align=left| Nongbenz Sitdobwad || Thapae Stadium || Chiang Mai, Thailand || TKO || 3 ||

|-  style="text-align:center; background:#cfc;"
| 2016-10-08 || Win ||align=left| Gretay Sitjaypa ||  || Buriram, Thailand || TKO || 3 ||

|-  style="text-align:center; background:#cfc;"
| 2016-10-07 || Win ||align=left| Nantida Sitweerachat ||  || Khorat, Thailand || Decision || 5 || 3:00

|-  style="text-align:center; background:#cfc;"
| 2016-09-30 || Win ||align=left| Ochin Sitthongsak || Suranaree Stadium || Khorat, Thailand || TKO || 2 ||

|-  style="text-align:center; background:#cfc;"
| 2016-09-10 || Win ||align=left| Nongfern Nakhonpanomwitayakom || Thapae Stadium || Chiang Mai, Thailand || TKO || 4 ||

|-  style="text-align:center; background:#fbb;"
| 2016-08-22 || Loss ||align=left| Kaewda Por.Muangpet ||  || Suphanburi, Thailand || Decision || 5 || 3:00

|-  style="text-align:center; background:#fbb;"
| 2016-08-12 || Loss ||align=left| Loma Lookboonmee || Asiatique Mall || Bangkok, Thailand || Decision || 3 || 3:00

|-  style="text-align:center; background:#cfc;"
| 2016-07-22 || Win ||align=left| Nongnaen Mor.Krungthepthonburi || Grand Boxing Stadium || Hua Hin, Thailand || TKO || 4 ||

|-  style="text-align:center; background:#cfc;"
| 2016-06-28 || Win ||align=left| Denkaewsa Baengarenggym ||  || Chiang Mai, Thailand || Decision || 5 || 3:00

|-  style="text-align:center; background:#cfc;"
| 2016-06-27 || Win ||align=left| Phetdawan SitYodpayaklampang || Chiang Mai Bowing Stadium || Chiang Mai, Thailand || TKO || 4 ||

|-  style="text-align:center; background:#cfc;"
| 2016-06-25 || Win ||align=left| Fahgnam Wangchompu || Chiang Rai University || Chiang Rai, Thailand || TKO || 4 ||

|-  style="text-align:center; background:#cfc;"
| 2016-06-01 || Win ||align=left| Baifern Por.Puipoonput || Thapae Stadium || Chiang Mai, Thailand || Decision || 5 || 3:00

|-  style="text-align:center; background:#fbb;"
| 2016-05-27 ||Loss ||align=left| Fahchiangrai Sor.Sakulthong ||  || Prachinburi, Thailand || Decision || 5 || 3:00

|-  style="text-align:center; background:#cfc;"
| 2016-04-23 || Win ||align=left| Fahchiangrai Sor.Sakulthong || Wat Chaiyo Worawihan || Ang Thong, Thailand || Decision || 5 || 3:00

|-  style="text-align:center; background:#cfc;"
| 2016-04-16 || Win ||align=left| Phetwapee Chor.Decha ||  || Hua Hin, Thailand || Decision || 5 || 3:00

|-  style="text-align:center; background:#cfc;"
| 2016-04-15 || Win ||align=left| Kaenkaew Kor.Klomkliao ||  || Nakhon Nayok, Thailand || Decision || 5 || 3:00

|-  style="text-align:center; background:#cfc;"
| 2016-04-13 || Win ||align=left| Rungnapa Por.Muangpet || Santi Chai Prakan Park || Bangkok, Thailand || Decision || 5 || 3:00

|-  style="text-align:center; background:#cfc;"
| 2016-03-17 || Win ||align=left| Duangdaonoi Looklongfan ||  || Ayutthaya, Thailand || Decision || 5 || 3:00

|-  style="text-align:center; background:#cfc;"
| 2016-03-04 || Win ||align=left| Fahchiangrai Sor.Sakulthong ||  || Chiang Rai, Thailand || Decision || 5 || 3:00
|-
! style=background:white colspan=9 |

|-  style="text-align:center; background:#cfc;"
| 2016-03-01 || Win ||align=left| Fahchiangrai Sor.Sakulthong || Thepprasit Stadium || Pattaya, Thailand || Decision || 5 || 3:00

|-  style="text-align:center; background:#cfc;"
| 2016-02-21 || Win ||align=left| Nongsom Sor.Wassana ||  || Khorat, Thailand || TKO || 3 ||

|-  style="text-align:center; background:#fbb;"
| 2016-02-13 || Loss ||align=left| Jomkwan Sitthongsak || Rajabhat Maha Sarakham University || Maha Sarakham, Thailand || Decision || 5 || 3:00

|-  style="text-align:center; background:#cfc;"
| 2016-02-05 || Win ||align=left| Gianna Cuello || Grand Boxing Stadium || Hua Hin, Thailand || Decision || 5 || 3:00

|-  style="text-align:center; background:#cfc;"
| 2016-01-15 || Win ||align=left| Fahchiangrai Sor.Sakulthong || Chiang Mai Boxing Stadium || Chiang Mai, Thailand || Decision || 5 || 3:00

|-  style="text-align:center; background:#cfc;"
| 2016-01-08 || Win ||align=left| Jompu Por.Penprapa || Rajabhat Maha Sarakham University || Maha Sarakham, Thailand || TKO || 4 ||

|-  style="text-align:center; background:#cfc;"
| 2016-01-05 || Win ||align=left| Mintza Por.Samingdam || Thepprasit Stadium || Pattaya, Thailand || TKO || 3 ||

|-  style="text-align:center; background:#cfc;"
| 2015-12-27 || Win ||align=left| Ploynapa Sakrungruang || Wat Hom Sin || Samut Prakan, Thailand || TKO || 2 ||

|-  style="text-align:center; background:#fbb;"
| 2015-12-18 || Loss ||align=left| Loma Lookboonmee || Grand Boxing Stadium || Hua Hin, Thailand || Decision || 5 || 3:00

|-  style="text-align:center; background:#fbb;"
| 2015-12-07 || Loss ||align=left| Rungnapa Por.Muangphet ||  || Chonburi, Thailand || Decision || 5 || 3:00

|-  style="text-align:center; background:#cfc;"
| 2015-12-03 || Win ||align=left| Nongbenz Sitdobwad || Chiang Mai Bowing Stadium || Chiang Mai, Thailand || TKO || 3 ||

|-  style="text-align:center; background:#fbb;"
| 2015-11-30 || Loss ||align=left| Muangsingjiew Or.Wanchert || Thapae Stadium || Lopburi, Thailand || Decision || 5 || 3:00

|-  style="text-align:center; background:#cfc;"
| 2015-11-25 || Win ||align=left| Chalamlek Phetdaotan || Thapae Stadium || Chonburi, Thailand || Decision || 5 || 3:00
|-
! style=background:white colspan=9 |

|-  style="text-align:center; background:#cfc;"
| 2015-11-17 || Win ||align=left| Kaewda Por.Muangphet || Thepprasit Stadium || Pattaya, Thailand || Decision || 5 || 3:00

|-  style="text-align:center; background:#cfc;"
| 2015-11-09 || Win ||align=left| Platutong Por.Kiatgym ||  || Udon Thani, Thailand || TKO || 4 ||

|-  style="text-align:center; background:#cfc;"
| 2015-11-08 || Win ||align=left| Rungnapa Por.Muangphet ||  || Chonburi, Thailand || Decision || 5 || 3:00
|-
! style=background:white colspan=9 |

|-  style="text-align:center; background:#cfc;"
| 2015-11-02 || Win ||align=left| Nongnui Sitdobwad || Chiang Mai Bowing Stadium || Chiang Mai, Thailand || TKO || 3 ||

|-  style="text-align:center; background:#cfc;"
| 2015-10-20 || Win ||align=left| Rungnapa Por.Muangphet || Thepprasit Stadium || Pattaya, Thailand || Decision || 5 || 3:00

|-  style="text-align:center; background:#fbb;"
| 2015-10-07 || Loss ||align=left| Baifern Bor.Buipoonput || Thapae Stadium || Chiang Mai, Thailand || Decision || 5 || 3:00

|-  style="text-align:center; background:#fbb;"
| 2015-09-29 || Loss ||align=left| Kaewda Por.Muangphet || Thepprasit Stadium || Pattaya, Thailand || Decision || 5 || 3:00

|-  style="text-align:center; background:#fbb;"
| 2015-08-21 || Loss ||align=left| Cherry Kor.Twingym || Savan Vegas Casino || Savannakhet, Laos || Decision || 5 || 3:00

|-  style="text-align:center; background:#fbb;"
| 2015-08-12 || Loss ||align=left| Kaewda Por.Muangphet || Queen's Birthday, Sanam Luang || Bangkok, Thailand || Decision || 5 || 3:00

|-  style="text-align:center; background:#cfc;"
| 2015-08-05 || Win ||align=left| Jomkwan Sitthongsak || Suranaree Stadium || Khorat, Thailand || Decision || 5 || 3:00

|-  style="text-align:center; background:#fbb;"
| 2015-07-05 || Loss ||align=left| Nongying Phettonpung ||  || Chiang Mai, Thailand || Decision || 5 || 3:00

|-  style="text-align:center; background:#cfc;"
| 2015-07-03 || Win ||align=left| Kraidatong Por.Promin || Grand Boxing Stadium || Hua Hin, Thailand || Decision || 5 || 3:00

|-  style="text-align:center; background:#cfc;"
| 2015-06-12 || Win ||align=left| Superbon Paladongym || Grand Boxing Stadium || Hua Hin, Thailand || TKO || 1 ||

|-  style="text-align:center; background:#cfc;"
| 2015-06-04 || Win ||align=left| Nanghong Liangprasert || Thapae Stadium || Chiang Mai, Thailand || Decision || 5 || 3:00

|-  style="text-align:center; background:#fbb;"
| 2015-05-01 || Loss ||align=left| Cherry Kor.Twingym || Kalare Stadium || Chiang Mai, Thailand || Decision || 5 || 3:00

|-  style="text-align:center; background:#cfc;"
| 2015-04-27 || Win ||align=left| Rungtiwa Kiatmongkol ||  || Trat, Thailand || TKO || 3 ||

|-  style="text-align:center; background:#cfc;"
| 2015-04-25 || Win ||align=left| Nongmai Sor.Phetsuphan ||  || Sa Kaeo, Thailand || TKO || 3 ||

|-  style="text-align:center; background:#fbb;"
| 2015-04-19 || Loss ||align=left| Loma Lookboonmee ||  || Chonburi, Thailand || Decision || 5 || 3:00

|-  style="text-align:center; background:#fbb;"
| 2015-04-11 || Loss ||align=left| Lookget Payalampong ||  || Chachoengsao, Thailand || Decision || 5 || 3:00

|-  style="text-align:center; background:#fbb;"
| 2015-03-26 || Loss ||align=left| Nongrung Sitkrudaeng ||  || Chanthaburi, Thailand || Decision || 5 || 3:00

|-  style="text-align:center; background:#cfc;"
| 2015-03-17 || Win ||align=left| Saotai Sor.Somgiatgym ||  || Ayutthaya, Thailand || Decision || 5 || 3:00

|-  style="text-align:center; background:#cfc;"
| 2015-03-08 || Win ||align=left| Lookget Payalampong ||  || Khorat, Thailand || Decision || 5 || 3:00

|-  style="text-align:center; background:#cfc;"
| 2015-02-22 || Win ||align=left| Kaewda Por.Muangpet ||  || Chachoengsao, Thailand || Decision || 5 || 3:00

|-  style="text-align:center; background:#fbb;"
| 2015-02-20 || Loss ||align=left| Nongfah Tor.Buamas ||  || Khon Kaen, Thailand || Decision || 5 || 3:00

|-  style="text-align:center; background:#fbb;"
| 2015-02-15 || Loss ||align=left| Loma Lookboonmee ||  || Khorat, Thailand || Decision || 5 || 3:00

|-  style="text-align:center; background:#fbb;"
| 2015-02-09 || Loss ||align=left| Thanonchanok Kaewsamrit || Kalare Stadium || Chiang Mai, Thailand || Decision || 5 || 3:00

|-  style="text-align:center; background:#cfc;"
| 2015-02-06 || Win ||align=left| Baifern Por.Buipoonbut || Kalare Stadium || Chiang Mai, Thailand || Decision || 5 || 3:00

|-  style="text-align:center; background:#cfc;"
| 2015-01-25 || Win ||align=left| Muangsingjiew Or.Wanchert ||  || Suphan Buri, Thailand || Decision || 5 || 3:00

|-  style="text-align:center; background:#cfc;"
| 2015-01-04 || Win ||align=left| Muangsingjiew Or.Wanchert || Max Muay Thai Stadium || Pattaya, Thailand || Decision || 3 || 3:00

|-  style="text-align:center; background:#cfc;"
| 2014-12-30 || Win ||align=left| Phetnaree Phetsakchai ||  || Surin, Thailand || TKO || 3 ||

|-  style="text-align:center; background:#cfc;"
| 2014-12-15 || Win ||align=left| Cherry Sityodtong || Thepprasit Stadium || Chiang Mai, Thailand || TKO || 4 ||

|-  style="text-align:center; background:#cfc;"
| 2014-12-05 || Win ||align=left| Thaksaporn Intachai ||  || Hua Hin, Thailand || Decision || 5 || 3:00

|-  style="text-align:center; background:#cfc;"
| 2014-12-01 || Win ||align=left| Chalamlek Phetdaotan || Thepprasit Stadium || Pattaya, Thailand || Decision || 5 || 3:00

|-  style="text-align:center; background:#cfc;"
| 2014-11-18 || Win ||align=left| Nongnoon Mor.Krunghtepthonburi ||  || Si Racha, Thailand || TKO || 3 ||

|-  style="text-align:center; background:#cfc;"
| 2014-11-16 || Win ||align=left| Saochongaen Sor.Sampon ||  || Bangkok, Thailand || TKO || 3 ||

|-  style="text-align:center; background:#cfc;"
| 2014-11-15 || Win ||align=left| Newnamchok Sor.Wilachat ||  || Buriram, Thailand || TKO || 2 ||

|-  style="text-align:center; background:#cfc;"
| 2014-11-06 || Win ||align=left| Muaylek Or.Janubon ||  || Prachinburi, Thailand || Decision || 5 || 3:00

|-  style="text-align:center; background:#c5d2ea;"
| 2014-11-05 || Draw ||align=left| Chalamlek Petdaotan ||  || Chonburi, Thailand || Decision || 5 || 3:00

|-  style="text-align:center; background:#cfc;"
| 2014-11-01 || Win ||align=left| "Kanda Por.Muangphet" ||  || Buriram, Thailand || TKO || 2 ||

|-  style="text-align:center; background:#cfc;"
| 2014-10-26 || Win ||align=left| Tawan Sitpoosakrasidtong ||  || Rayong, Thailand || TKO || 3 ||

|-  style="text-align:center; background:#cfc;"
| 2014-10-25 || Win ||align=left| Kangwan Sor.Praithong ||  || Bangkok, Thailand || TKO || 3 ||

|-  style="text-align:center; background:#cfc;"
| 2014-10-17 || Win ||align=left| Namtan-A Sitthailand ||  || Buriram, Thailand || TKO || 4 ||

|-  style="text-align:center; background:#cfc;"
| 2014-10-06 || Win ||align=left| Muangchonlek Sor.Hengcharoen || Chua Kraow Stadium || Chonburi, Thailand || TKO || 4 || 
|-
! style=background:white colspan=9 |

|-  style="text-align:center; background:#cfc;"
| 2014-10-04 || Win ||align=left| Sam-A Sit ||  || Maha Sarakham, Thailand || TKO || 3 ||

|-  style="text-align:center; background:#fbb;"
| 2014-09-29 || Loss ||align=left| Star Sor.Klimnee || Thepprasit Stadium || Chiang Mai, Thailand || Decision || 5 || 3:00

|-  style="text-align:center; background:#cfc;"
| 2014-09-15 || Win ||align=left| Phetseegnern Sor.Adisorn || Suranaree Stadium || Khorat, Thailand || TKO || 4 ||

|-  style="text-align:center; background:#cfc;"
| 2014-08-26 || Win ||align=left| Nongna Lookponak ||  || Buriram, Thailand || TKO || 2 ||

|-  style="text-align:center; background:#cfc;"
| 2014-08-12 || Win ||align=left| Saya Ito ||  || Bangkok, Thailand || Decision || 5 || 3:00

|-  style="text-align:center; background:#fbb;"
| 2014-08-08 || Loss ||align=left| Cherry Sityodtong || Pattaya World Boxing Stadium || Pattaya, Thailand || Decision || 5 || 3:00

|-  style="text-align:center; background:#cfc;"
| 2014-07-04 || Win ||align=left| Benchamin Looktaidon || Pattaya World Boxing Stadium || Pattaya, Thailand || TKO || 2 ||

|-  style="text-align:center; background:#cfc;"
| 2014-06-13 || Win ||align=left| Kaewda Por.Muangphet || Thepprasit Stadium || Pattaya, Thailand || Decision || 5 || 3:00

|-  style="text-align:center; background:#fbb;"
| 2014-05-18 || Win ||align=left| Baifern Bor.Buipoonput || Thapae Stadium || Chiang Mai, Thailand || TKO (cut) || 3 ||

|-  style="text-align:center; background:#cfc;"
| 2014-05-05 || Win ||align=left| Gwantong Pettriantong || Thapae Stadium || Chiang Mai, Thailand || TKO || 4 ||

|-  style="text-align:center; background:#fbb;"
| 2014-04-21 || Loss ||align=left| Nongem Tor.Witthaya || Thapae Stadium || Chiang Mai, Thailand || Decision || 5 || 3:00

|-  style="text-align:center; background:#cfc;"
| 2014-04-17 || Win ||align=left| Nongploy WPChiangmai ||  || Chiang Mai, Thailand || TKO (doctor stoppage) || 3 ||

|-  style="text-align:center; background:#cfc;"
| 2014-04-09 || Win ||align=left| Phetdara Sitkruod ||  || Chiang Mai, Thailand || TKO (elbows & knees) || 4 ||

|-  style="text-align:center; background:#fbb;"
| 2014-04-05 || Loss ||align=left| Nongpin Phettonpueng || || Chiang Mai, Thailand || Decision || 5 || 3:00

|-  style="text-align:center; background:#cfc;"
| 2014-04-02 || Win ||align=left| Pupae Soongeelamoo7 || || Chiang Mai, Thailand || TKO || 2 ||

|-  style="text-align:center; background:#cfc;"
| 2014-03-25 || Win ||align=left| Phetdara Sitkruod || || Chiang Mai, Thailand || Decision || 5 || 3:00

|-  style="text-align:center; background:#cfc;"
| 2014-03-18 || Win ||align=left| Nongtoy Yodkhunsuk || || Chiang Mai, Thailand || TKO || 3 ||

|-  style="text-align:center; background:#fbb;"
| 2014-02-19 || Loss ||align=left| Lommanee Sor.Hiran || Pattaya Boxing World Stadium || Pattaya, Thailand || TKO (doctor stoppage) || 2 ||

|-  style="text-align:center; background:#fbb;"
| 2014-02-07 || Loss ||align=left| Star Sor.Klimnee || Pattaya Boxing World Stadium || Pattaya, Thailand || Decision || 3 || 3:00

|-  style="text-align:center; background:#cfc;"
| 2014-01-31 || Win ||align=left| Duangphet Sitputia || Pattaya Boxing World Stadium || Pattaya, Thailand || TKO || 2 ||

|-  style="text-align:center; background:#cfc;"
| 2014-01-11 || Win ||align=left| Namwan Senyentafo || || Chiang Mai, Thailand || Decision || 5 || 3:00

|-  style="text-align:center; background:#fbb;"
| 2013-12-28 || Loss ||align=left| Nongem Tor.Witthaya || || Chiang Mai, Thailand || Decision || 5 || 3:00

|-  style="text-align:center; background:#fbb;"
| 2013-12-22 || Loss ||align=left| Nongphet Kor.Saklampun || || Chiang Mai, Thailand || Decision || 5 || 3:00

|-  style="text-align:center; background:#fbb;"
| 2013-12-08 || Loss ||align=left| Sudsiam Sor.Sumalee || Maejo University || Chiang Mai, Thailand || Decision || 5 || 3:00

|-  style="text-align:center; background:#fbb;"
| 2013-11-30 || Loss ||align=left| Thanonchanok Kaewsamrit || || Lampang, Thailand || Decision || 5 || 3:00

|-  style="text-align:center; background:#fbb;"
| 2013-11-16 || Loss ||align=left| Cherry Kor.Towingym || || Chiang Mai, Thailand || Decision || 5 || 3:00

|-  style="text-align:center; background:#fbb;"
| 2013-11-10 || Loss ||align=left| Phetnamgarm Phettongpueng || || Chiang Mai, Thailand || Decision || 5 || 3:00

|-  style="text-align:center; background:#fbb;"
| 2013-11-02 || Loss ||align=left| Nongploy WPChiangmai || || Chiang Mai, Thailand || Decision || 5 || 3:00

|-  style="text-align:center; background:#fbb;"
| 2013-10-23 || Loss ||align=left| Hongfah Sitjenok || || Chiang Mai, Thailand || TKO (knees) || 3 ||

|-  style="text-align:center; background:#cfc;"
| 2013-10-20 || Win ||align=left| Phetlanna Phettongpueng || || Chiang Mai, Thailand || TKO (knees) || 4 ||

|-  style="text-align:center; background:#cfc;"
| 2013-10-14 || Win ||align=left| Nongmai Sor.Phetphupan || || Chiang Mai, Thailand || TKO (knees) || 4 ||

|-  style="text-align:center; background:#cfc;"
| 2013-10-10 || Win ||align=left| Seuaphet Liangprasert || Thapae Stadium || Chiang Mai, Thailand || TKO (knees) || 3 ||

|-  style="text-align:center; background:#cfc;"
| 2013-09-28 || Win ||align=left| Cherry Kor.Towingym || Thapae Stadium || Chiang Mai, Thailand || Decision || 5 || 3:00

|-  style="text-align:center; background:#cfc;"
| 2013-09-16 || Win ||align=left| Tukatatong Pichitman || Thapae Stadium || Chiang Mai, Thailand || TKO (knees) || 2 ||

|-  style="text-align:center; background:#fbb;"
| 2013-08-30 || Loss ||align=left| Sudsiam Sor.Sumalee || Kalare Stadium || Chiang Mai, Thailand || Decision || 5 || 3:00

|-  style="text-align:center; background:#cfc;"
| 2013-08-23 || Win ||align=left| Fahchiangrai Sor.Sakulthong || Kalare Stadium || Chiang Mai, Thailand || Decision || 5 || 3:00

|-  style="text-align:center; background:#cfc;"
| 2013-08-12 || Win ||align=left| Yodying Sor.Sumalee || Kalare Stadium || Chiang Mai, Thailand || Decision || 5 || 3:00

|-  style="text-align:center; background:#cfc;"
| 2013-07-26 || Win ||align=left| Yodying Sor.Sumalee || Kalare Stadium || Chiang Mai, Thailand || Decision || 5 || 3:00

|-  style="text-align:center; background:#fbb;"
| 2013-07-16 || Loss ||align=left| Yodying Sor.Sumalee || Kalare Stadium || Chiang Mai, Thailand || Decision || 5 || 3:00

|-  style="text-align:center; background:#cfc;"
| 2013-07-12 || Win ||align=left| Kulabhin Sor.Chalermchai || Kalare Stadium || Chiang Mai, Thailand || TKO (knees) || 3 ||

|-  style="text-align:center; background:#fbb;"
| 2013-06-28 || Loss ||align=left| Muangsingjiew Or.Wanchert || 700 Year Stadium || Chiang Mai, Thailand || Decision || 5 || 3:00

|-  style="text-align:center; background:#cfc;"
| 2013-06-01 || Win ||align=left| Nongying Phettongpueng || || Chiang Mai, Thailand || TKO || 2 ||

|-  style="text-align:center; background:#cfc;"
| 2013-05-25 || Win ||align=left| Phetmuangfang Sor.Sor.Chiangmai || || Chiang Mai, Thailand || Decision || 5 || 3:00

|-  style="text-align:center; background:#fbb;"
| 2013-05-18 || Loss ||align=left| Fahchiangrai Sor.Sakulthong || || Chiang Mai, Thailand || Decision || 5 || 3:00

|-  style="text-align:center; background:#cfc;"
| 2013-05-08 || Win ||align=left| Phetmuangfang Sor.Sor.Chiangmai || || Chiang Mai, Thailand || Decision || 5 || 3:00

|-  style="text-align:center; background:#cfc;"
| 2013-05-01 || Win ||align=left| Nongkwangngern Sitthahanek || || Chiang Mai, Thailand || Decision || 5 || 3:00

|-  style="text-align:center; background:#c5d2ea;"
| 2013-04-11 || Draw ||align=left| Fahchiangrai Sor.Sakulthong || || Chiang Mai, Thailand || Decision || 5 || 3:00

|-  style="text-align:center; background:#fbb;"
| 2013-03-26 || Loss ||align=left| Nongkwangngern Sitthahanek || || Phayao, Thailand || Decision || 5 || 3:00

|-  style="text-align:center; background:#cfc;"
| 2013-03-19 || Win ||align=left| Nongkwangngern Sitthahanek || Kalare Stadium || Chiang Mai, Thailand || TKO (knees) || 3 ||

|-  style="text-align:center; background:#cfc;"
| 2013-03-08 || Win ||align=left| Nongying Phettongpueng || Kalare Stadium || Chiang Mai, Thailand || TKO (knees) || 3 ||

|-  style="text-align:center; background:#cfc;"
| 2013-03-01 || Win ||align=left| Yodying Sor.Sumalee || Kalare Stadium || Chiang Mai, Thailand || TKO (knees) || 4 ||

|-  style="text-align:center; background:#fbb;"
| 2013-02-15 || Loss ||align=left| Yodying Sor.Sumalee || Kalare Stadium || Chiang Mai, Thailand || Decision || 5 || 3:00

|-  style="text-align:center; background:#fbb;"
| 2013-02-09 || Loss ||align=left| Nongmai Sitrapee || || Chiang Mai, Thailand || Decision || 5 || 3:00

|-  style="text-align:center; background:#fbb;"
| 2013-01-22 || Loss ||align=left| Yodying Sor.Sumalee || Kalare Stadium || Chiang Mai, Thailand || Decision || 5 || 3:00

|-  style="text-align:center; background:#cfc;"
| 2013-01-12 || Win ||align=left| Nongmaem Por.Puipoonput || Kalare Stadium || Chiang Mai, Thailand || Decision || 5 || 3:00

|-  style="text-align:center; background:#c5d2ea;"
| 2012-12-11 || Draw ||align=left| Phetjing J.A.Gym || Kalare Stadium || Chiang Mai, Thailand || Decision || 5 || 3:00

|-  style="text-align:center; background:#cfc;"
| 2012-12-05 || Win ||align=left| Yodying Sor.Sumalee || King's Birthday || Chiang Mai, Thailand || Decision || 5 || 3:00

|-  style="text-align:center; background:#cfc;"
| 2012-11-29 || Win ||align=left| Nongploy WPChiangmai || || Chiang Rai, Thailand || TKO (knees) || 2 ||

|-  style="text-align:center; background:#cfc;"
| 2012-11-16 || Win ||align=left| Kendo WPChiangmai || Kalare Stadium || Chiang Mai, Thailand || TKO (knees) || 3 ||

|-  style="text-align:center; background:#cfc;"
| 2012-11-03 || Win ||align=left| Kwangngern Wor.Bor || || Chiang Mai, Thailand || TKO  || 4 ||

|-  style="text-align:center; background:#cfc;"
| 2012-10-26 || Win ||align=left| Saolampang J.A.Gym || Kalare Stadium || Chiang Mai, Thailand || Decision || 5 || 3:00

|-  style="text-align:center; background:#cfc;"
| 2012-10-12 || Win ||align=left| Yodying Sor.Sumalee || Kalare Stadium || Chiang Mai, Thailand || TKO (knees) || 2 ||

|-  style="text-align:center; background:#cfc;"
| 2012-10-02 || Win ||align=left| Thaemtong Sittongplee || || Chiang Mai, Thailand || TKO || 3 ||

|-  style="text-align:center; background:#fbb;"
| 2012-09-21 || Loss ||align=left| Phetchaodoi J.A.Gym || Kalare Stadium || Chiang Mai, Thailand || Decision || 5 || 3:00

|-  style="text-align:center; background:#cfc;"
| 2012-08-31 || Win ||align=left| Yodying Sor.Sumalee || Kalare Stadium || Chiang Mai, Thailand || Decision || 5 || 3:00

|-  style="text-align:center; background:#fbb;"
| 2012-08-17 || Loss ||align=left| Phetchaodoi J.A.Gym || Kalare Stadium || Chiang Mai, Thailand || Decision || 5 || 3:00

|-  style="text-align:center; background:#cfc;"
| 2012-07-27 || Win ||align=left| Yodying Sor.Sumalee || Kalare Stadium || Chiang Mai, Thailand || TKO (knees) || 4 ||

|-  style="text-align:center; background:#fbb;"
| 2012-07-13 || Loss ||align=left| Yodying Sor.Sumalee || Kalare Stadium || Chiang Mai, Thailand || Decision || 5 || 3:00

|-  style="text-align:center; background:#c5d2ea;"
| 2012-06-29 || Draw ||align=left| Phetngama J.A.Gym || Kalare Stadium || Chiang Mai, Thailand || Decision || 5 || 3:00

|-  style="text-align:center; background:#cfc;"
| 2012-06-20 || Win ||align=left| Phetkarat Phettongpueng || || Chiang Mai, Thailand || TKO (knees) || 3 ||

|-  style="text-align:center; background:#cfc;"
| 2012-06-09 || Win ||align=left|  || || Chiang Mai, Thailand || TKO (elbows) || 2 ||

|-  style="text-align:center; background:#cfc;"
| 2012-05-25 || Win ||align=left| Payaksaw Phettongpueng || || Chiang Mai, Thailand || TKO || 2 ||

|-  style="text-align:center; background:#fbb;"
| 2012-05-11 || Loss ||align=left| Phetkarat Phettongpueng || Kalare Stadium || Chiang Mai, Thailand || Decision || 5 || 3:00

|-  style="text-align:center; background:#fbb;"
| 2012-04-27 || Loss ||align=left| Phetngama J.A.Gym || Kalare Stadium || Chiang Mai, Thailand || Decision || 5 || 3:00

|-  style="text-align:center; background:#cfc;"
| 2012-04-20 || Win ||align=left|  || Kalare Stadium || Chiang Mai, Thailand || TKO (knees) || 1 ||

|-  style="text-align:center; background:#fbb;"
| 2010-03-05 || Loss ||align=left| Tori Richardson || Modified Kickboxing rules || Bangkok, Thailand || Decision || 3 || 3:00

|-  style="text-align:center; background:#cfc;"
| 2010-02-16 || Win ||align=left|  || || Chiang Mai, Thailand || TKO (body kick) || 2 ||

|-  style="text-align:center; background:#cfc;"
| 2010-02-02 || Win ||align=left|  || || Chiang Mai, Thailand || TKO (knees) || 2 ||

|}
Legend:

Amateur record

|-  style="text-align:center; background:#fbb;"
| 2012-01-20 || Loss ||align=left| Angela Hill || Friday Night Fights || Manhattan, U.S.A || Decision || 5 || 3:00

|-  style="text-align:center; background:#fbb;"
| 2011-09-20 || Loss ||align=left| Patti Teran || Lion Fight 3 || Las Vegas, U.S.A || Decision || 5 || 3:00

|-  style="text-align:center; background:#fbb;"
| 2011-05-13 || Loss ||align=left| Jessica Ng || Take-on Productions || Queens, U.S.A || Decision || 5 || 3:00

|-  style="text-align:center; background:#fbb;"
| 2011-04-30 || Loss ||align=left| Giovanna Camacho || Gleason's Gym, Boxing rules || Brooklyn, U.S.A || Decision || 5 || 3:00

|-  style="text-align:center; background:#fbb;"
| 2011-03-04 || Loss ||align=left| Angela Hill || Friday Night Fights || Manhattan, U.S.A || Decision || 5 || 3:00

|-  style="text-align:center; background:#fbb;"
| 2010-12-11 || Loss ||align=left| Piloshmee Deonarain || Take-on Productions || Queens, U.S.A || Decision || 5 || 3:00

|-  style="text-align:center; background:#fbb;"
| 2010-10-18 || Loss ||align=left| Tanya Lohr || Take-on Productions || Queens, U.S.A || Decision || 5 || 3:00

|-  style="text-align:center; background:#cfc;"
| 2010-07-18 || Win ||align=left| Jessica Ng || Take-on Productions || Queens, U.S.A || Decision || 5 || 3:00

|-  style="text-align:center; background:#cfc;"
| 2010-06-11 || Win ||align=left| Min Godspeed || Friday Night Fights || United States || TKO || 2 ||

|-  style="text-align:center; background:#fbb;"
| 2009-06-27 || Loss ||align=left| Piloshmee Deonarain || WKA Nationals || Richmond, U.S.A || Decision || 5 || 3:00

|}
Legend:

References

1983 births
People from Boulder, Colorado
Sylvie von Duuglas-Ittu
Living people
Female Muay Thai practitioners
American female kickboxers
American YouTubers